Saint Joseph Seminary College (also known as St. Ben or St. Ben's) is a Catholic seminary in Saint Benedict, Louisiana. Founded in 1891, it is operated by the Benedictine monks of Saint Joseph Abbey and the dioceses in the ecclesiastical provinces of New Orleans and Mobile.

Academics
The college is accredited by the Southern Association of Colleges and Schools and offers Bachelor of Arts degrees in philosophy in either liberal arts or religious studies to men seeking eventual ordination as priests in the Roman Catholic Church. The college also has a two-year pre-theology program for students who have already attained a college degree. After attending Saint Joseph Seminary College, seminarians wishing to continue priestly studies will attend a graduate seminary. In the past, Saint Joseph Seminary College has also offered degrees with majors in psychology, history, and English.

Bonfire football game
There is also the tradition of a flag football game, called Bonfire, between St. Ben's and the graduate seminary of New Orleans, Notre Dame. This tradition has gone on for well over 70 years. The annual game takes place in a field on the vast property of the Abbey the Friday before Thanksgiving. The students at St. Ben's spend weeks building a massive bonfire out of the downed trees on the surrounding forests owned by the Abbey. After the game, the two seminaries join to share in fellowship and traditional Louisiana foods around the bonfire.

Notable alumni
 Jules Jeanmard, first bishop of the Diocese of Lafayette, Louisiana
 Bernard Francis Law, cardinal and archbishop emeritus of the Archdiocese of Boston, Massachusetts
 John Clement Favalora, archbishop emeritus of the Archdiocese of Miami, Florida
 Joseph Nunzio Latino, bishop emeritus of the Diocese of Jackson, Mississippi
 Ronald Paul Herzog, current bishop of the Diocese of Alexandria, Louisiana
 Robert William Muench, bishop emeritus of the Diocese of Baton Rouge, Louisiana
 Glen John Provost, current bishop of the Diocese of Lake Charles, Louisiana
 Gregory Michael Aymond, current archbishop of the Archdiocese of New Orleans, Louisiana
 Shelton Joseph Fabre, current bishop of the Diocese of Houma-Thibodaux

Notes

External links
Official website

Benedictine colleges and universities
Catholic seminaries in the United States
Universities and colleges accredited by the Southern Association of Colleges and Schools
Educational institutions established in 1889
1889 establishments in Louisiana